Cairn Frederick Newton  (6 April 1991), known as Cairn Newton-Evans, is a former Welsh volunteer police officer and academic.

Personal life
Newton-Evans was born in Swansea, Wales, and was brought up in the former coal mining Amman Valley in Carmarthenshire, attending Brynamman County Primary School and Ysgol Dyffryn Aman (Amman Valley School). After graduating from Swansea Metropolitan University (now University of Wales Trinity Saint David) with a HND in Technical Theatre and working for theatre companies such as National Theatre Wales, Volcano Theatre Company and Swansea City Opera, Newton-Evans married Dafydd Llyr Evans on 14 August 2015.

Career

Newton-Evans joined the Special Constabulary after being the victim of a violent homophobic hate crime which left him requiring surgery to fix his injuries and was Chief Officer of Dyfed-Powys Police Special Constabulary before being forced to resign under gross misconduct charges after an investigation by the DPP Professional Standards Department in November 2019 found he had sexually assaulted colleagues during a night out on 8 November 2019. He is banned from serving in the police in the future.  After graduating with a first class honours degree in Law and Public Services, Newton-Evans worked as a lecturer in Law, Policing and Public Services at University of Wales Trinity Saint David until June 2020.

Awards
In 2012, Newton-Evans was awarded for an Outstanding Contribution to Policing at the All-Wales Special Constabulary Awards for his work in engaging with diverse communities across a large rural area within South West Wales.

In 2015, he was recognised for great and valuable services to the communities of the Shrievalty of Dyfed for his continued work alongside the police service and the LGBT community across the Dyfed-Powys Police area of Wales.

In 2017, he was the proud recipient of the Welsh Government’s St David Award for Citizenship in the National Awards for Wales and returned in 2018 and 2019 to join the St David Award's advisory committee on behalf of the First Minister of Wales.

On 28 December 2018 he was the honoured to have been gazetted as the recipient of a British Empire Medal in the 2019 New Year Honours List for services to Policing and the LGBT Community across Wales and joined the list of British Special Constables awarded honours by the sovereign.

Honours
x30px

References

Living people
Dyfed-Powys Police officers
People from Swansea
Welsh police officers
British special constables
British police chief officers
1991 births